Leptokoenenia is a genus of Eukoeneniid microwhip scorpions, first described by Bruno Condé in 1965.

Species 
, the World Palpigradi Catalog accepts the following five species:

 Leptokoenenia gallii (Christian, 2009) – Italy
 Leptokoenenia gerlachi Condé (fr), 1965 – Saudi Arabia
 Leptokoenenia pelada Souza & Ferreira, 2013 – Brazil
 Leptokoenenia scurra Monniot, 1966 – Republic of the Congo
 Leptokoenenia thalassophobica Souza & Ferreira, 2013 – Brazil

References 

Palpigradi
Taxa named by Bruno Condé